John Bromley (c. 1652–1707), of White River, Saint Philip, Barbados, and Horseheath Hall, Cambridgeshire, was an plantation owner and English politician.

Life
He was of obscure origin but had moved to Barbados. He was a member of the Assembly in Montserrat in 1678 and in Barbados itself from 1685 to 1690, where he was elected speaker in 1689–90. He was a member of the Barbados council from June 1690 to 1693 and from 1696 to after 1698. Around that time he returned to England and established himself in Cambridgeshire by buying the Horseheath estate, thereafter living the typical life of an English squire, including acting as a Deputy-Lieutenant of Cambridgeshire.

He was a Member (MP) of the Parliament of England for Cambridgeshire 1705 to October 1707.

He died in 1707 and was buried at Horseheath. He had married Dorothy, and had 2 sons, the eldest of which, John, inherited Horseheath and his father's parliamentary seat.

References

1652 births
1707 deaths
People from Horseheath
English MPs 1705–1707
Deputy Lieutenants of Cambridgeshire